Readership may refer to:
 The group of readers of a particular publication or writer: their target audience
 The total number of readers of a particular publication (newspaper, magazine, book), as proxy-measured by web/app views or print circulation
 The occupational position of a reader, particularly as an academic rank